Thriprayar Shree Ramaswami Temple is Hindu temple situated in Triprayar in Thrissur district of Kerala state in India. The deity is Rama, the seventh incarnation of Vishnu, with four arms bearing a conch, a discus, a bow, and a garland. The temple is situated on the bank of the river Theevra. The temple deity is the presiding deity of Arattupuzha Pooram. It is believed that the idol here was worshipped by Krishna, another avatar of Vishnu in Dvaraka. Along with Rama, there are shrines for Shiva as Dakshinamoorthy, Ganesha, Shastha and Krishna, and there is also worship for Hanuman and Chathan. It is the first among the four temples housing the four sons of King Dasharatha, popularly known as Nalambalams, the others being Koodalmanikyam Temple in Irinjalakuda housing Bharata, Thirumuzhikoolam temple housing Lakshmana and Payammal housing Shatrughna in that order. It is believed that worshipping these temples on a single day in the Malayalam month of Karkadakam is very auspicious, and thus many devotees visit these temples.  Thriprayar temple used to be owned & administered by the 3 famous Nambudiri families namely Cheloor mana, Janappilly Mana and Punnappilly Mana before it was handed over to the Cochin Devaswom Board. Still, the heads of these three families serve as the Ooralans of the temple and take part in the rituals and festivals in accordance with the customs.

Story behind the origin of the temple 
The deities presently worshiped in the Nalambalams were worshiped by Krishna in Dwaraka during Dvapara Yuga.

See also
 Sethubandhanam at Sreeraman Chira Chemmappilly
 Nalambalam
 Sethubandhanam
 cheloor mana

References

Images

Hindu temples in Thrissur district